Joseph (Yawsep) Hūzāyā (fl. c. 530) was a Nestorian teacher and author. His name indicates that he hailed from Khuzestan.

Joseph was a disciple of Narsai. He was the maqryānā (reader) of the School of Nisibis at the end of the 5th and in the first half of the 6th century. His position involved the teaching of reading and interpretation. Later accounts make him the second director of the school, but this is an error.

According to a note on the last page (folio 312v) of the only surviving manuscript of the Nestorian Mašlmonutho (British Library, Add. 12138), Joseph invented the nine accents or points of Syriac ekphonetic notation. These punctuation marks indicate tone and rhythm for recitation. According to the Jacobite historian Bar Hebraeus, Joseph merely altered a preexisting system from Edessa into the one that prevailed in the Nestorian churches. The truth may lie somewhere between these interpretations. Joseph's system was in widespread use by 600.

Bar Hebraeus also records that Joseph wrote a work on homographs, which may have been the first in the history of the Syriac language. Since the Syriac alphabet is purely consonantal, homographs are words with the same consonants but different vowels and different meanings. According to the Nestorian manuscripts and the work of the Nestorian literary historian ʿAbdishoʿ bar Brikha, the Syriac translation of Dionysius Thrax's Art of Grammar was the work of Joseph. The Jacobite manuscript tradition, however, leaves the translation anonymous. This translation may better be called an adaptation. Joseph omits those part of the Art that are specific only to Greek (such as those on orthography and phonology), while adapting others (e.g., diathesis) with Syriac examples.

Notes

Bibliography

6th-century scholars
Syriac writers
Church of the East writers
Christians in the Sasanian Empire
People from Khuzestan Province